Constance Endicott Hartt (November 2, 1900 – December 21, 1984) was a U.S. botanist notable for her research on sugarcane. She was born in Passaic, New Jersey. She graduated from Mount Holyoke College in 1922. She taught at St. Lawrence University and Connecticut College. She also worked as a botanist for the Hawaiian Sugar Planters' Association. Hartt died in Hawaii in 1984.

References

American agronomists
1900 births
1984 deaths
American women botanists
Women agronomists
Agriculture in Hawaii
American sugar industry
Connecticut College faculty
St. Lawrence University faculty
People from Hawaii
People from Passaic, New Jersey
People of the Territory of Hawaii
Scientists from New Jersey
20th-century American botanists
20th-century American women scientists
Scientists from New York (state)
American women academics
20th-century agronomists